The Gist of the Gemini is the fourth studio album by Italian-Canadian singer Gino Vannelli. The album was released in 1976 and was produced by Gino and his brother Joe Vannelli, together with Geoff Emerick.

Track listing

Personnel 
 Gino Vannelli – lead and backing vocals, arrangements, acoustic piano (6), clavinet (8, 11)
 Joe Vannelli – acoustic and electric pianos, clavinet, synthesizers, string and brass arrangements 
 Richard Baker – organ, synthesizers, synth bass, string and brass arrangements 
 Jay Graydon – electric guitars
 Ross Vannelli – guitars, backing vocals
 Graham Lear – drums
 John J. Mandell – timpani, percussion
 Dido Morris – congas, cuica, timbales
 Dianne Brooks – backing vocals 
 Brenda Russell – backing vocals 
 The John McCarthy Choir – backing vocals (6)

Production 
 Producers – Gino Vannelli, Joe Vannelli and Geoff Emerick.
 Engineer – Geoff Emerick
 Assistant Engineers – Jon Kelly and Steve Prestage
 Remixed by Norm Kinney at Sound Labs (Hollywood, CA).
 Mastered by Bernie Grundman at A&M Studios (Hollywood, CA).
 Art Direction and Design – Fabio Nicola
 Photography – Clive Arrowsmith and Gered Mankowitz

Charts

Singles

References

External links
 

Gino Vannelli albums
1976 albums
Albums produced by Geoff Emerick
A&M Records albums